The 5th South American Youth Championships in Athletics were held in Montevideo, Uruguay from November 11–13, 1978.

Medal summary
Medal winners are published for boys and girls. Complete results can be found on the "World Junior Athletics History" website.

Men

Women

Medal table (unofficial)

Participation (unofficial)
Detailed result lists can be found on the "World Junior Athletics History" website.  An unofficial count yields the number of about 179 athletes from about 7 countries:  

 (39)
 (38)
 (38)
 (14)
 Perú (15)
 (22)
 (13)

References

External links
World Junior Athletics History

International athletics competitions hosted by Uruguay
South American U18 Championships in Athletics
South American Youth Championships
South American U18 Championships|South American Youth Championships
Youth sport in Uruguay